Makuru FC is a Solomon Islands football club, playing in the Honiara FA League.

They won the 2004 and 2006/2007 Honiara FA League title. The team is also known as JP Su'uria.

They declined to join the newly formed Telekom S-League due to religious reasons since they did not want to play on Saturdays.

Titles
Solomon Islands National Club Championship: (0)
Honiara FA League: (2)
2004, 2007. 
Solomon Islands Cup: (0)

Performance in OFC competitions
OFC Champions League: 1 appearances 
Best: Group stage in 2005
2005: Group stage

Current squad

References

Football clubs in the Solomon Islands
Honiara